Zenon Bolesław Świętosławski  (December 22, 1811 in Warsaw – December 6, 1875 in St Helier, Jersey) was a Polish emigre and socialist utopian, participant of the November Uprising in 1830. He earned a living as a printer.

He was a member of the Polish Democratic Society, and co-founder and ideologist of the Gromady Rewolucyjnej Londyn in London along with Henryk Abicht, Jan Krynski and Ludwik Oborski, He published a collection of documents in exile in England.

References

Polish printers
Polish socialists
Polish revolutionaries
Polish expatriates in the United Kingdom
1811 births
1875 deaths
Politicians from Warsaw
Polish exiles